Parker Mesa is a prominent snow-covered mesa 4 nautical miles (7 km) southeast of Skew Peak, in the south part of Clare Range, Victoria Land. This high, flattish feature was named by Advisory Committee on Antarctic Names (US-ACAN) for Bruce C. Parker, United States Antarctic Research Program (USARP) biologist who conducted limnological studies at Antarctic Peninsula (1969–70) and in Victoria Land (1973–74 and 1974–75).

Mesas of Antarctica
Landforms of Victoria Land
Scott Coast